Helianthus × laetiflorus, the cheerful sunflower or perennial sunflower, is a plant in the family Asteraceae. It is widespread in scattered locations across much of Canada from Newfoundland to British Columbia, and the central and eastern United States as far south as Texas and Georgia.

Description
Helianthus × laetiflorus is a herbaceous plant with alternate, simple leaves, on green stems. The flowers are yellow, borne in late summer.

References

laetiflorus
Hybrid plants
Flora of North America
Plants described in 1807